Toxasteridae is an extinct  family of sea urchins.

These slow-moving shallow infaunal deposit feeder-detritivores lived during the Cretaceous period, from 145.5 to 61.7 Ma.

Genera
Adytaster
Aphelaster
Douvillaster
Enallopneustes
Heteraster
Isaster
Isomicraster
Macraster
Mokotibaster
Palmeraster
Polydesmaster
Toxaster

References

Spatangoida
Cretaceous first appearances
Cretaceous extinctions